The Young Guard of United Russia (MGER) is the youth wing of the United Russia party. Founded in 2005, it uses the name of the famous Young Guard, a World War II underground organization. A largely pro-Putin youth direct action group, the Young Guard claims to have 85 regional branches across Russia from the Crimea and Kaliningrad to Vladivostok on the Pacific.

The Young Guard was founded to unite Russian youth, to engage young people into social-political life of Russia. The organization develops projects in many categories, e.g. "Volunteering", "Youth Electoral Campaigning", "Healthy Nation", "Accessible Environment", "Innovator", "Street Energy", 'My History', 'My Territory', "Youth Parliamentarianism", "Youth Federal Assembly", "Senses Factory", etc.

The organization has 160,000  members. The co-presidents of its coordinating council are Alena Arshinova and Timur Prokopenko.

In late December 2010 convicted spy Anna Chapman was appointed to the public council of the organization.

References

External links
 Molodaya gvardiya website 

Russian political activists
Youth wings of political parties in Russia
United Russia
Anti-Ukrainian sentiment in Russia
Russian nationalism

he:המשמרת הצעירה
sv:Unga Gardet